Gregory William Hawgood (born August 10, 1968) is a Canadian former professional ice hockey defenceman who played in the National Hockey League (NHL) with the Boston Bruins, Edmonton Oilers, Philadelphia Flyers, Florida Panthers, Pittsburgh Penguins, San Jose Sharks, Vancouver Canucks and Dallas Stars. Hawgood was born in Edmonton, Alberta.

Playing career
Hawgood spent his junior career with the Kamloops Blazers of the WHL, and made such an impression that the Blazers retired his #4 sweater. He represented Canada twice at the World Junior Championships, including the infamous Punch-up in Piestany at the 1987 tournament. (Hawgood emerged from the brawl with a broken nose, thanks to a head butt from Vladimir Konstantinov.) Hawgood was named to the all-star team at the following year's WJC in Moscow, leading Canada to the gold medal.

Hawgood would spend two decades in pro hockey, starting with the Boston Bruins (who selected him in the tenth round of the 1986 NHL Draft); he would wind up donning the sweaters of seven other NHL clubs, as well as several minor league and European teams, before finally retiring as a player in 2006.

Coaching career
On November 8, 2007, Hawgood was named head coach of the Blazers. Hawgood then moved to the position of Coach and finally Assistant Coach with the Kamloops Storm of the KIJHL. He started the 2009–2010 season as Head Coach, but lost that position due to the continued poor performance of the team. It was announced prior to the start of the 2010–2011 season that he would not be continuing with the team in any capacity.

Awards
 WHL West First All-Star Team – 1986, 1987, & 1988
1988 World Junior Ice Hockey Championships - tournament all-star team
Eddie Shore Award - 1991–92
Governor's Trophy - 1995–96
Larry D. Gordon Trophy - 1998–99

Career statistics

Regular season and playoffs

International

External links
 

1968 births
Living people
Asiago Hockey 1935 players
Boston Bruins draft picks
Boston Bruins players
Canadian expatriate ice hockey players in Finland
Canadian expatriate ice hockey players in Italy
Canadian ice hockey defencemen
Cape Breton Oilers players
Chicago Blackhawks scouts
Chicago Wolves players
Cleveland Lumberjacks players
Dallas Stars players
Edmonton Oilers players
Florida Panthers players
HC TPS players
Houston Aeros (1994–2013) players
Kamloops Blazers players
Kamloops Junior Oilers players
Kansas City Blades players
Kölner Haie players
Las Vegas Thunder players
Philadelphia Flyers players
Pittsburgh Penguins players
St. Albert Saints players
San Jose Sharks players
Ice hockey people from Edmonton
Tappara players
Utah Grizzlies (AHL) players
Vancouver Canucks players